Luke Paul Hoare Shaw (born 12 July 1995) is an English professional footballer who plays as a left-back or centre-back for  club Manchester United and the England national team.

Originally a member of Southampton's youth system, Shaw made his first-team debut for the club in January 2012. He signed his first professional contract in May that year before becoming a regular in the Southampton team over the next two seasons. In June 2014, Shaw was signed by Manchester United for £30 million, then a world record transfer fee for a teenager.

Shaw made his senior international debut for England in March 2014 in a 1–0 friendly win against Denmark, and later that year was selected in the squad for the FIFA World Cup. He scored his first international goal in the UEFA Euro 2020 final, which was also the fastest ever scored in a UEFA European Championship final and fifth fastest in the tournament’s history.

Early life
Shaw was born in Kingston upon Thames, London and raised in Molesey, Surrey. He attended Chandlers Field Primary School and Rydens Enterprise School, where he helped the Under-15 team reach the semi-finals of the English Schools' FA Cup. He began playing grassroots football with Hersham and Molesey Juniors. Shaw grew up as a Chelsea supporter and idolised full-back Ashley Cole. He played at Chelsea's development centre in Guildford, but was not offered an academy place. He has said that he wanted to eventually play for the club.

Club career

Southampton

Early career
In 2002, Shaw joined the Southampton Academy at the age of seven, and became a regular in the under-18 team from the age of 15. His first association with the first team came in September 2011, when he was an unused substitute in a League Cup match against Preston North End. During the January 2012 transfer window, it was reported that Premier League clubs Arsenal, Chelsea, and Manchester City had shown interest in signing 16-year-old Shaw, with the then-Championship club reportedly valuing the defender at £4 million. Southampton quickly responded to such claims though, with then-manager Nigel Adkins assuring the media that "Luke Shaw is a big part of our future plans", and claiming that the club had "no intention … of letting any of [their] young players move on".

At the age of 16, Shaw made his debut for the Southampton first team on 28 January 2012 in the FA Cup, replacing winger Jason Puncheon for the final 13 minutes of the third round tie against Millwall, which finished 1–1. Following the club's promotion to the top flight in May 2012, Shaw was one of four youth players offered a professional contract for their return to the Premier League, along with Jack Stephens, Calum Chambers and James Ward-Prowse.

2012–13 season
The defender made his first start for the Southampton first team in August 2012, playing the full 90 minutes of a 4–1 win over Stevenage in the League Cup, and on 10 November 2012, he became the youngest Southampton player to start a match in the Premier League when he was chosen to play at left-back against Swansea City, completing 74 minutes of the 1–1 draw.

Shaw continued to make regular appearances throughout the season, and in manager Nigel Adkins's final match as Southampton manager on 16 January 2013, he set up the second goal in a 2–2 draw away to Chelsea, providing a cross from the left wing for Jason Puncheon to convert in the 75th minute. In an away match against Norwich City in March 2013, Shaw was involved in a collision with striker Grant Holt, which resulted in conceding a penalty in the first minute of injury time at the end of the match, although Artur Boruc saved the ensuing spot kick to ensure the match ended goalless. Shaw finished his first professional season with 28 appearances for Southampton, including 25 in the Premier League.

2013–14 season

On 12 July 2013, Shaw's 18th birthday, he signed a new five-year contract with Southampton. Shaw scored one goal during Southampton's pre-season preparations, scoring the last in an 8–0 win over Spanish team Palamós on 20 July 2013.

In the first match of the 2013–14 season, Shaw was directly involved in the goal that saw Southampton win against West Bromwich Albion when he was fouled in the penalty area by Youssouf Mulumbu in the 89th minute, with Rickie Lambert converting the resulting spot kick to see the Saints edge victory.

On 18 April 2014, Shaw was named as one of the six players on the shortlist for the PFA Young Player of the Year award. He was also selected as left-back in the 2013–14 PFA Team of the Year.

Manchester United

2014–2019
On 27 June 2014, Shaw signed a four-year contract (with an option to extend for a further year) with Manchester United for an undisclosed fee thought to be in the region of £30 million, becoming the most expensive teenager in world football. Chelsea were also interested in Shaw, but they backed away from a deal fearing the teenager's excessive pay demands would cause friction in their dressing room.

Shaw made his debut in the first match of the club's pre-season tour of the United States, playing the first 45 minutes of a 7–0 win over the LA Galaxy. Before the start of the season, he suffered a hamstring injury that ruled him out for a month. Shaw was named as a substitute for Manchester United for the first time on 14 September 2014 in their fourth league match, and was unused as they recorded their first victory of the season against Queens Park Rangers. After again being an unused substitute in the subsequent defeat to Leicester City, Shaw made his competitive debut for United on 27 September 2014, playing the entirety of a 2–1 home victory against West Ham United.

In October 2014, Shaw was named on the 40-man shortlist for the 2014 Golden Boy award, a prize given to the player considered to be the best European-based player under the age of 21.

On 8 February 2015, Shaw was sent off after receiving a second yellow card during a 1–1 draw with West Ham. On 18 April 2015, Shaw made his return to the starting line-up, replacing the injured Daley Blind. His first match since 9 March 2015 ended in a 1–0 defeat to league leaders Chelsea, but Shaw put up a solid performance and was praised by captain Wayne Rooney.

Shaw started every league match in the early part of the 2015–16 season until 15 September 2015, when, during the opening match of the Champions League group stage against PSV, Shaw was caught by Héctor Moreno with a sliding tackle and suffered a double leg fracture. Shaw was given oxygen and treated by nine medical staff during the nine-minute stoppage in Eindhoven before he was taken off on a stretcher and taken to hospital. Shaw was out of action for six months, before returning to training on 4 April 2016.

On 7 August 2016, Shaw made his first competitive appearance since suffering his double leg fracture in September 2015, as Manchester United won 2–1 against Leicester City to lift the 2016 FA Community Shield.

On 10 August 2018, Shaw scored his first senior goal in the league opener against Leicester City as Manchester United won 2–1. Shaw also won the season's first Player of the Month award in August and again in September. He signed a new five-year contract with United on 18 October 2018. On 2 April, Shaw was announced as United's Player of the Month for March – achieving three in total during the season. At the end of the season, Shaw was voted Manchester United Players' Player of the Year and Sir Matt Busby Player of the Year.

2020–present
On 5 March 2020, Shaw scored his only goal of this season in a 3–0 FA Cup win at Derby County.

On 2 February 2021, Shaw made two assists before he was substituted at half-time in Manchester United's Premier League record-equalling 9–0 home win against Southampton. On 7 March, Shaw scored his first league goal since August 2018 in the derby win against Manchester City.

On 20 December 2022, Shaw's contract was extended by a further year. In January 2023, Shaw played in an unfamiliar centre-back role, receiving positive reviews. He assisted the opener and played the full 90 minutes for Manchester United as they defeated Newcastle United 2–0 in the 2023 EFL Cup final.

International career

Youth
Shaw's first experience of international football came in 2011, when he made six appearances for the England under-16 team. He made his debut against Slovenia in February, before competing in the Montaigu Tournament in April and scoring his first international goal against Uruguay at the tournament. He later made his debut for the under-17 team in August against Italy, and played in eight matches in a seven-month stint with the national team.

In January 2013, Shaw was set to be called up for the first time to the England under-21 team for the following month's friendly against Sweden, with then-manager Stuart Pearce calling the Southampton defender "an outstanding talent". However, due to an injury picked up in training, he was later forced to pull out of the match. The uncapped defender was subsequently called up for matches against Romania on 21 March, Austria on 25 March, and Scotland on 13 August, as well as the UEFA European Under-21 Championship, all of which he had to pull out of for the same reason. He eventually made his England under-21 debut on 5 September when the team faced Moldova in a 2015 UEFA European Under-21 Championship qualification match, and he also played the full 90 minutes of England's second qualification match against Finland on 9 September.

Senior
On 27 February 2014, Shaw was called up to the England senior team for the first time, for their friendly with Denmark. He made his debut in the match, replacing Ashley Cole at half-time. England won the match 1–0. On 12 May 2014, Shaw was named in Roy Hodgson's 23-man squad for the 2014 FIFA World Cup. He was included at the expense of the experienced Cole, who retired from internationals as a result. He was England's second-choice left-back behind Leighton Baines, and made his tournament debut in the last group match, a 0–0 draw with Costa Rica in Belo Horizonte. He also holds the accolade of being the youngest player to appear at the 2014 tournament.

Shaw was included in the England squad for UEFA Euro 2020. On 11 July 2021, Shaw scored the fastest ever goal in a European Championship final, against Italy in the UEFA Euro 2020 final, with just two minutes on the clock. However, his early goal was not enough to give England their first major title in 55 years, as Italy emerged victorious in a penalty shoot-out after a 1–1 draw in extra time.

Shaw was included in the 26-man England squad for the 2022 FIFA World Cup. Playing in the starting 11 of all 5 matches England played. And assisting Jude Bellingham in scoring the opening goal in a 6-2 victory against Iran.

Style of play

As a left-back with a tendency to play attacking football, Shaw has been compared to former Southampton youth product Gareth Bale, with particular focus being placed on his speed, decision-making and defending skills. Former England international and FA Director of Football Development Trevor Brooking has described Shaw as "technically very gifted". He received favourable comparisons to and praise from former Brazil left-back Roberto Carlos during England's run to the Euro 2020 Final.

Career statistics

Club

International

England score listed first, score column indicates score after each Shaw goal

Honours
Manchester United
 EFL Cup: 2022–23
FA Community Shield: 2016
UEFA Europa League: 2016–17; runner-up: 2020–21

England
UEFA European Championship runner-up: 2020

Individual
PFA Team of the Year: 2013–14 Premier League, 2020–21 Premier League
Sir Matt Busby Player of the Year: 2018–19
Manchester United Players' Player of the Year: 2018–19, 2020–21

References

External links

Profile at the Manchester United F.C. website
Profile at the Football Association website

1995 births
Living people
Footballers from Kingston upon Thames
English footballers
Association football defenders
Southampton F.C. players
Manchester United F.C. players
Premier League players
UEFA Europa League winning players
England youth international footballers
England under-21 international footballers
England international footballers
2014 FIFA World Cup players
UEFA Euro 2020 players
2022 FIFA World Cup players